Por Favor is the sixth studio album by the American singer-songwriter Brett Dennen. It was released on May 20, 2016, by Elektra Records.

Track listing

References

2016 albums
Brett Dennen albums
Elektra Records albums